The Battle of Alegaon was fought between Nizam Ali Khan of Hyderabad and Raghunathrao of the Maratha Empire against Madhavrao I of the Maratha Empire. Raghunathrao had established an alliance with Nizam Ali Khan of Hyderabad. When conflict arose between Raghunathrao and Madhavrao I, a joint campaign between Nizam Ali Khan and Raghunathrao resulted in Madhavrao I being heavily defeated. Madhavrao I surrendered on 12 November 1762. Nizam Ali Khan got all of his previously lost territories that were lost at the Battle of Udgir. Madhavrao I submitted to his uncle, Raghunathrao.

References

Alegaon
Alegaon
1762 in India